are areas or zones designated by the Japan Tourism Agency from 2008. As of April 2009, 30 Tourism Areas are located throughout Japan. The Japan Tourism Agency set the law in 2008 regarding this area to support and promote more synergistic activities among local governments, tourism associations, tourism industries and local hotels and other local organizations and individuals.

Tourism Areas may promote Visit Japan Campaign hosted by Japanese government through Japan Tourism Agency and Ministry of Land, Infrastructure, Transport and Tourism.

Features 
Tourism Areas is featured with natural sites, World Heritage Site, old Japanese cultural site, Onsen locations and others as attractive place for tourists. Each area is named in Japanese with mixture of kanji, hiragana and katakana ending with 観光圏. Each area also have their own advertising slogans or catch phrases to represent natural features and hospitality of local people. Most Tourism Areas also promote local people to learn more English, Chinese language, Korean language and other languages for better communication for tourists from countries worldwide.

Approved Tourism Areas 
Approved Tourism Areas name with advertising slogan in literal translation (unofficial), with its official naming and advertising slogan list in Japanese. (Some Tourism Area does not claim advertising slogan.)

Hokkaido 
Furano and Biei wide Tourism Area : Traveling as if like live short time-Rural vacation road
()

Shiretoko Peninsula (World Heritage Site) Tourism Area : Traveling to invite more unknown
()

Sapporo wide Tourism Area : For Either City or nature people, welcome! to Sapporo area
()

 HakodateTourism Area: ---
()

 Kushiro Marsh, Lake Akan and Lake Mashū Tourism Area: ---
()

Tohoku 
New Aomori and Lake Towada wide Tourism Area :---
()

Glittering Sea of Japan Uetsu (West half of Yamagata Prefecture) Tourism Area : Sea of Japan, gods of mountains, river run and hospitality through meal
()

Date (dandy) wide Tourism Area : Travel with stay in slow life and dandy time
()

Aizu and Yonezawa wide Tourism Area : Unchanged warmth mind and variety of joys - Aizu Yonezawa thousand of cloister walkway
()

Fukushima Tourism Area : Kind and warmth mind of nature
()

 happy and happy ♪ flowery Yamagata Tourism Area: ---
()

Kanto 
Nikko (World Heritage Site) Tourism Area : ---
()

Mito and Hitachi Tourism Area : Your sky and soil
()

South Boso district Tourism Area : Travel of family's time - Weaving of sea side and satoyama- South Boso communication roads
()

 Hakone, Yugawara, Atami and Ashigara Tourism Area: ---
()

 Mount Fuji and Fuji Five Lakes Tourism Area: ---
()

 Yatsugatake Tourism Area: ---
()

Hokuriku Shin'etsu 
Snow country Tourism Area : Immediate access to another world, be sure to want visit snow country again
()

Toyama bay and Kurobe canyon Etchū Niikawa Tourism Area : ---
()

Noto Peninsula Tourism Area : ---
()

Fukui and Sakai Tourism Area : ---
()

 Heart fluttery Sado and Niigata Tourism Area: ---
()

 Etchū and Hida  Tourism Area: ---
()

Chūbu 

Mount Fuji and Fuji Five Lakes Tourism Area : Attractive planning for stay in or repeating visit upon be proud of Fuji nature and culture
()

Lake Hamana Tourism Area : ---
()

Ise-Shima district Tourism Area : Creating re-asu (re-tomorrow,  rias coast) Ise-Shima coast
()

 East Kishū wide Tourism Area: ---
()

Kansai 
Lake Biwa and Ōmi road Tourism Area : ---
()

Kyoto fu Tango Tourism Area : slack as like at home, encircle and warmer mood in Tango
()

Healing and revive by the core of Kumano sacred (World Heritage Site) Tourism Area : Healthy- Spirit, Walking, forest bathing and foods
()

Awaji Island Tourism Area : Welcome back - Home of mythology - Awaji Island
()

Chūgoku 
San'in cultural Tourism Area : Making Intimate relationship impressive travel
()

Hiroshima, Miyajima (World Heritage Site) and Iwakuni district Tourism Area : Aiming form up of international tourism zone for travel Hiroshima Miyajima Iwakuni 
()

 Hiroshima - Ehime Seto islands sea route wide Tourism Area: ---
()

Okayama

Shikoku 
West Awa Tourism Area : Create spending Heart filling time in origin of Japanese landscape decorated by histories and traditions
()

Shimanto River and headland Ashizuri (Hata District) Tourism Area : ---
({{lang|ja|四万十・足摺エリア(幡多地域)観光圏 : ---}})

 Kagawa Seto Inland Sea art Tourism Area: ---
()

 Kyūshū and Okinawa Hirado, Sasebo and Saikai long stay Tourism Area : Journey in the West starting from sea
()Unzen-Amakusa Tourism Area : ---
()New west Kyūshū Tourism Area : Journey of Spring and small bay in New west Kyūshū like The Travels of Marco Polo
()Aso Kujū Tourism Area : Walk with wind, meet the sunlight, entertained by variant of color in free time and space.
()

 Genkai Sea Tourism Area: ---
()

 Toyo 2nd millennium  Tourism Area:''' ---
()

See also 
Japan National Tourist Organization
Tourism in Japan

External links
JNTO site in English
Visit Japan Campaign Yokoso! Japan by JNTO

2008 establishments in Japan
Tourism in Japan
Tourist attractions in Japan